Joseph Stanislaus Conwell (born February 24, 1961) is a former American football offensive tackle who played two seasons with the Philadelphia Eagles of the National Football League. He was drafted by the San Francisco 49ers in the second round of the 1984 NFL Supplemental Draft. He played college football at the University of North Carolina at Chapel Hill and attended Lower Merion High School in Ardmore, Pennsylvania. Conwell was also a member of the Philadelphia/Baltimore Stars of the United States Football League.

He is the brother of singer Tommy Conwell.

References

External links
Just Sports Stats

Living people
1961 births
Players of American football from Philadelphia
American football offensive tackles
North Carolina Tar Heels football players
Philadelphia Eagles players
Philadelphia/Baltimore Stars players
Lower Merion High School alumni